McDonagh Productions was a short-lived Australian production company that produced feature and short films. It was run by the McDonagh sisters, Phyllis, Isabel and Paulette. The company eventually went broke after the failure of its last two features.

Filmography
Those Who Love (1926)
The Far Paradise (1928)
The Cheaters (1930)
Australia in the Swim (1931) - documentary
How I Play Cricket (1931) - documentary
The Mighty Conqueror (1932) - documentary
The Trail of the Roo (1932) - documentary
Two Minutes Silence (1933)

References

External links
McDonagh Sisters at the Women Film Pioneers Project

Film production companies of Australia